La Enea is a corregimiento in Guararé District, Los Santos Province, Panama with a population of 1,186 as of 2010. Its population as of 1990 was 871; its population as of 2000 was 1,128.

References

Corregimientos of Los Santos Province